North Luangwa National Park is a national park in Zambia, the northernmost of the three in the valley of the Luangwa River.  Founded as a game reserve in 1938, it became a national park in 1972 and now covers 4,636 km².

Like the South Luangwa National Park, its eastern boundary is the Luangwa River, while it rises to cover a stretch of the Muchinga Escarpment to the west. The Mwaleshi River flows east–west through the Centre of the park, the area to its south being a strict wilderness zone.

Wildlife is widely found, including Cookson's wildebeest, Crawshay's zebra and many antelopes and birds.  Elephant numbers have recovered from poaching in the 1970s and 1980s.  The struggle against poaching in the park was described by Delia and Mark Owens in their book The Eye of the Elephant.

For many years, its wildlife suffered greatly from poaching, but recent years have seen poaching almost entirely stopped.  It has generally suffered from a lack of investment and interest compared to the much more popular South Luangwa National Park, although its flora and fauna are very similar to its southern counterpart.  In 2003, black rhinos were re-introduced to the park.

Since 2005, the protected area is considered a Lion Conservation Unit together with South Luangwa National Park.

References

National parks of Zambia
Protected areas established in 1938
Geography of Northern Province, Zambia
Important Bird Areas of Zambia
Central Zambezian miombo woodlands